The  is a professional wrestling round-robin tag team tournament held annually by the Japanese professional wrestling promotion World Wonder Ring Stardom. It was created in 2011.

The Goddesses of Stardom Tag League are held under a multi-point system. Two points for a win, one for a time-limit draw, and none for any other kind of loss. The team finishing atop the points standings are considered the winners of their respective blocks. The winners of the final match between both block winners will be considered the champions. All the matches in the tournament have a 20-minute time limit. The tournament was previously known as the Goddesses of Stardom Tag Title League until 2012 when it was also disputed for the Goddess of Stardom Championship. From 2012 to date, the winners of the tournament only receive the right to challenge for the titles as number one contenders.

The first winners of the league were Yoko Bito and Yuzuki Aikawa who won the tournament on July 27, 2011, also being crowned the inaugural Goddess of Stardom Champions. Kairi Hojo, Yoko Bito, Nanae Takahashi and Momo Watanabe share the record for the most individual victories with two, with different partners.

Tournament history
The Goddesses of Stardom Tag League is a professional wrestling tournament held each autumn by Stardom. Similar to Bushiroad-owned male counterpart New Japan Pro-Wrestling with the World Tag League or the Super Junior Tag League. It is currently held as a round-robin tournament with wrestlers split into two pools. The winners of each pool will compete in the final to decide the winner. As is the case with the NJPW World Tag Leagues, a win is two points and a draw is one point for each wrestler. 

There have been a total of eleven editions of the tournament from which eleven teams emerged as winners, being composed of nineteen distinctive wrestlers.

2017

The 2017 edition of the event extended over five days, starting with October 14 and culminating on November 12, 2017.

2018

The 2018 edition of the event extended over six days, starting with October 13 and culminating on November 4, 2018.

2019

The 2019 edition of the event extended over five days, starting with October 19 and culminating on November 15, 2019. The third day of the tournament which was held in Osaka, was the only day that consisted of an afternoon and an evening show.

2020

The 2020 edition of the tournament was the tenth from the banch of events and extended on nine days and took place starting with October 10 and culminating on November 8, 2020. The stipulation of the competition was that each team from both blocks would wrestle the teams in the other block rather than those from their own. The entire event portraited members of the active stables in the promotion, Donna Del Mondo, Queen's Quest, Oedo Tai and STARS wrestling under various combinations of sub-groups.

The winners of the tournament were AZM and Momo Watanabe who defeated Giulia and Maika in the finals.

2021

The 2021 edition of the tournament took place starting with October 17 and culminated on November 14, 2021. The participants were announced in a press conference held on October 13 and broadcast on Stardom's YouTube channel which was also for the matches of the Kawasaki Super Wars pay-per-view from November 3 which took place during the tag league.

2022

The 2022 edition of the tournament took place starting on October 23 and culminated on December 4, 2022. It was the biggest tag league event to its date with sixteen teams entering it. The participants were announced in a press conference held on October 3 and broadcast on Stardom's YouTube channel.

Notes

See also
World Tag League
Super Junior Tag League

References

External links
Page Stardom World

World Wonder Ring Stardom shows
Women's professional wrestling tournaments
Tag team tournaments